School Master is a 1964 Indian Malayalam-language film, directed by debutant S. R. Puttanna Kanagal. Produced by B. R. Panthulu, it was a remake of producer's own 1958 Kannada movie School Master. The film stars Prem Nazir, K. Balaji, Ragini and Thikkurissy Sukumaran Nair. The film had musical score by G. Devarajan.

Plot 

The film revolves about an old school master and his noble attempt to transform the students of his native village.

Cast 
Thikkurissy Sukumaran Nair as School Head Master/Raman Pilla
Aranmula Ponnamma as School Master's wife
Prem Nazir as Aniyan
K. Balaji
T. S. Muthaiah as School Manager/Shekharan Nair
Ragini as Sarala
Ambika as Vishalam
Sivaji Ganeshan as Johnny
Sowcar Janaki as Wife of Johny (guest appearance)
Adoor Bhasi as Appunni Nair
Bahadoor as Damodharan
S. P. Pillai as Kuttan Pilla
Pankajavalli as Bhavaniyamma
Kalpana as Vasanthi
Prathapachandran as Gopala Pilla
 Ramesh
Kutty Padmini
Vidhubala as Child Artist

Themes 
B. Vijayakumar of The Hindu wrote, "School Master focused on undesirable practices of school managements. A successful social film it propagated integral morals and glorified teacher-student relationship."

Soundtrack 
The music was composed by G. Devarajan and the lyrics were written by Vayalar Ramavarma.

References

External links 

1960s Malayalam-language films
Films directed by Puttanna Kanagal
Malayalam remakes of Kannada films